Beulah May Annan (née Sheriff; November 18, 1899 – March 10, 1928) was an American suspected murderer. Her story inspired Maurine Dallas Watkins's play Chicago in 1926. The play was adapted into a 1927 silent film, a 1975 stage musical, and a 2002 movie musical (which won the Academy Award for Best Picture), all with that title, and a 1942 romantic comedy film, Roxie Hart, named for the character who Annan inspired.

Early life
Annan was born Beulah May Sheriff in Owensboro, Kentucky, to Mary (née Neel) and John R. Sheriff. While living in Kentucky, she married her first husband, newspaper linotype operator Perry Stephens. They soon divorced, and Beulah then met car mechanic Albert "Al" Annan. They went to Chicago together, where they got married on March 29, 1920.

In Chicago, Albert found work as a mechanic at a garage and Beulah eventually became a bookkeeper at Tennant's Model Laundry. At the laundry she met Harry Kalstedt and the two began an affair.

Murder
On April 3, 1924, in the married couple's bedroom, Annan shot Kalstedt in the back. According to her initial story, they had been drinking wine which Kalstedt had brought over, and got into an argument. There was a gun on the bed and both reached for it, but Beulah got it first and shot Kalstedt while he was putting on his coat and hat. She played a foxtrot record, "Hula Lou", over and over for about four hours as she sat drinking cocktails and watching Kalstedt die. She then called her husband to say that she had killed a man who had "tried to make love" to her.

The trial
Annan's story changed over time: first, she confessed to the murder; later, Annan claimed that she shot Kalstedt in self-defense, fearing that she was about to be raped. According to one of her later versions of the story, he told her that he was leaving her, she reacted angrily and then shot him. Prosecutors surmised that Kalstedt threatened to leave Annan and she responded to his threat by shooting him in a jealous rage. Her final story at her trial was that she told Kalstedt that she was pregnant, they struggled, and both of them reached for the gun.

Albert Annan stood by her after her arrest, pulled his money out of the bank to get her the best lawyers and stood by her throughout the trial. The day after the trial ended with her acquittal, on May 25, 1924, Beulah Annan announced, "I have left my husband. He is too slow." In 1926 she claimed that he had deserted her and divorced him.

Later life
In 1927, after her divorce from Annan was finalized, she married Edward Harlib, a boxer. Just three months later she claimed that he had been cruel to her and filed for divorce. In the divorce settlement, Harlib paid her $5,000 (equivalent to $,000 in current dollars). After her divorce from Harlib, Annan was involved with a fourth man, Able Marcus.

Death
Annan died of tuberculosis, aged 28, at the Chicago Fresh Air Sanatorium, where she was staying under the name Beulah Stephens, in 1928, four years after her acquittal on charges of murder.

She was returned to her home state for burial in Mount Pleasant Cumberland Presbyterian Church Cemetery, Daviess County, Kentucky. Her grave marker incorrectly notes her death as a year earlier, however, stating it to be March 10, 1927.

References

Further reading
 Thomas H. Pauly (ed.): Chicago: With the Chicago Tribune Articles that Inspired It. Southern Illinois University 1997; 
 Douglas Perry: The Girls of Murder City, Viking, 2010; 

1899 births
1928 deaths
20th-century deaths from tuberculosis
People from Chicago
People from Owensboro, Kentucky
Tuberculosis deaths in Illinois